Serine/threonine-protein phosphatase 2B (PP2B) may refer to:

PP2BA – PP2B catalytic subunit alpha isoform
PP2BB – PP2B catalytic subunit beta isoform
PP2BC – PP2B catalytic subunit gamma isoform